Lorna Webb (born 26 May 1983) is an English professional cyclist from Walsall, West Midlands, born in Runcorn. She represented Great Britain twice at the World Championships in Plouay and Lisbon as a junior.

Palmarès

2003
1st Overall Jo Brunton Women's RR Series 2003
1st Moscow Gallops Jo Brunton RR
1st Michelin National Women's Team Road Race
2nd Women's Omnium, Milton Keynes
3rd Women's Omnium, Halesowen

2005
2nd 500m TT, British National Track Championships
2nd Sprint, British National Track Championships

2006
2nd British National Road Race Championships
1st Cheshire Classic Women's Road Race
3rd Corswarem (BEL)
1st Burcht (BEL)
3rd Circuit de Wallonie (BEL)
3rd Helfaut (FRA)

References

1983 births
Living people
English female cyclists
Sportspeople from Runcorn
Sportspeople from Walsall